Kevin Vangu Phambu Bukusu (born 27 February 2001) is a German professional footballer who plays as a defender for Austrian Bundesliga club Wolfsberger AC.

Club career
Bukusu have played youth football for several clubs including Bayer Leverkusen. On 17 July 2020, Eerste Divisie club NEC Nijmegen announced the signing of Bukusu on a two-year deal. He made his professional debut on 3 October 2020 in a 6–0 league win against FC Eindhoven. On 30 August 2021, he joined Helmond Sport on a season-long loan.

On 1 September 2022, Bukusu joined Austrian club Wolfsberger AC on a free transfer.

International career
Born in Germany, Bukusu is of Angolan descent. He is a former German youth international. He was part of Germany U17 team for the 2018 UEFA European Under-17 Championship.

In August 2021, Bukusu was called up to Angola national team for 2022 FIFA World Cup qualification matches against Egypt and Libya.

Personal life
Bukusu's elder brother Herdi is also a professional footballer.

References

External links
 
 

2001 births
Living people
Footballers from North Rhine-Westphalia
Sportspeople from Aachen
Association football defenders
German footballers
Germany youth international footballers
German people of Angolan descent
Eerste Divisie players
NEC Nijmegen players
Helmond Sport players
Wolfsberger AC players
German expatriate footballers
German expatriate sportspeople in the Netherlands
German expatriate sportspeople in Austria
Expatriate footballers in the Netherlands
Expatriate footballers in Austria